The Hobie 14 is an American catamaran sailing dinghy that was designed by Hobie Alter and first built in 1967.

The design was developed into the Hobie 16 in 1971.

Production
The Hobie 14 was the initial design produced by Hobie Cat and led to a large family of similar boats that have been produced in numbers exceeding 200,000.

The design was built by Hobie Cat in the United States from 1967 until 2004 and in Europe until the late 2000s, but it is now out of production.

Design
The Hobie 14 is a recreational sailboat, built predominantly of fiberglass over a foam core. In its base model it has a fully battened catboat rig with a rotating mast and aluminum spars. A jib can be added to make it a fractional sloop rig and a trapeze is optional. The asymmetrical hulls have spooned raked stems, vertical transoms and dual transom-hung rudders controlled by a tiller. The design has an elevated trampoline for the crew. The boat has no keels, relying on the curved shape of the hulls below the waterline to prevent leeway when sailing to windward. The design displaces .

It can be transported on a trailer.

The design has a Portsmouth Yardstick racing average handicap of 86.4 and is raced with a crew of one or two sailors.

Variants
Hobie 14
Model with a single sail catboat rig.
Hobie 14 Turbo
Model with a mainsail and jib, fractional sloop rig. A trapeze is optional

Operational history
The Hobie 14 is a World Sailing competition class.

In a 1994 review Richard Sherwood wrote, "The Hobie 16 and 18 ... are faster and perhaps more popular, but the Hobie 14 was the first ... This very fast boat has been clocked at over 24 mph ... Hobies are, with Sunfish, found at resorts all over the world. There are racing fleets to match. There are regional area, national, and world championships."

See also
List of sailing boat types
List of multihulls

Related development
Hobie 16

References

External links

Dinghies
Catamarans
1960s sailboat type designs
Classes of World Sailing
Sailboat type designs by Hobie Alter
Sailboat types built by Hobie Cat